Barbie: Super Sports is a sports video game for PlayStation and Microsoft Windows developed by Runecraft and published by Mattel Media. Players can choose to play as either Barbie, Teresa, Christie or Kira. Two sports are available: snowboarding and roller skating.

Reception
GameFAQs gave Barbie: Super Sports a bad rating of 2.38 out of 5 overall, criticising the sound saying "The sound effects, certainly not fulfilling the quantity side of the quota and the quality side of things are debatable as well" but praised the graphics stating "The characters and backdrops combine together pretty well to create what is the highlight of the Barbie Super Sports package", despite little criticism saying "The animations are a bit blocky, sometimes moving as if they’re living underwater and the main problem with the cast is that they’re not quite big enough".

References

External links
 Barbie: Super Sports at GameSpot
 

1999 video games
Super Sports
Multiplayer and single-player video games
PlayStation (console) games
Video games developed in the United Kingdom
Windows games